The Bashi Channel is a waterway between Y'Ami Island of the Philippines and Orchid Island of Taiwan. It is a part of the Luzon Strait in the Pacific Ocean. It is characterized by windy storms during the rainy period, June to December.

The Bashi Channel is an important passage for military operations. Both the Philippines and Taiwan dispute the ownership of the waters because both sides say the region lies within 200-nautical-mile from their shores. The channel is also significant to communication networks. Many of the undersea communication cables that carry data and telephone traffic between Asian countries pass through the Bashi Channel, making it a major potential point of failure for the Internet. In December 2006, a magnitude 6.7 submarine earthquake cut several undersea cables at the same time, causing a significant communications bottleneck that lasted several weeks.

See also
 2006 Hengchun earthquake
 Cape Eluanbi
 Qixingyan (Taiwan)

References

External links

Straits of the Philippines
Straits of Taiwan
Straits of Asia
Borders of the Philippines
Borders of the Republic of China
International straits
Landforms of Batanes
Landforms of Pingtung County